is a Japanese director, storyboard artist, and former producer best known for directing Descending Stories: Showa Genroku Rakugo Shinju (2016) and Kaguya-sama: Love is War (2019).

Career
Omata began his career in the industry in the mid 1990s as an producer at Phoenix Entertainment, which he worked with until 2001. He mainly worked as either an animation producer for hentai series, or as an assistant production manager on series Phoenix Entertainment produced. In 2009, he became an active storyboard artist with Shaft, first serving on the 9th episode of Natsu no Arashi! Akinai-chū. During his tenure with Shaft, he worked mainly under the direction of Akiyuki Shinbo and Yukihiro Miyamoto, with whom he directed and storyboarded several episodes to Arakawa Under the Bridge, Puella Magi Madoka Magica, and Ground Control to Psychoelectric Girl. In 2012, Omata left Shaft's ranks and began working mainly for Studio Deen, where he would make his first series directorial debut with Sankarea: Undying Love under the pseudonym . Shinbo's own style with Shaft is regarded to be a sort of "artistic renaissance" within the anime industry, and Omata's own directorial works after his leave from the studio have also been regarded as such. Descending Stories: Showa Genroku Rakugo Shinju, for example, has been praised for its storytelling and direction despite limited and inconsistent animation from the studio's animation team. Following his work with Studio Deen, Omata began a relationship with A-1 Pictures in 2018, where he directed the fantasy war series Record of Grancrest War, and the following year was given directorial responsibilities for Kaguya-sama: Love is War. The series garnered immediate success and was included as a runner-up for Funimation's "Decade of Anime" fan-poll award for "Favorite Romance Series of the Decade" was nominated at the 2020 Crunchyroll Anime Awards for Best Comedy. The second season garnered seven awards at the 2020 Newtype Anime Awards, including Best Director for Omata.

Works

Television series
 Highlights roles with series directorial duties.

OVAs/ONAs
 Highlights roles with series directorial duties.

Films
 Highlights roles with series directorial duties.

Other works
Note: Some of Omata's series directorial works appear here due to his involvement as something other than an episode/unit director or storyboard artist, in which case his name will be highlighted in the "Director(s)" column.

Notes

References

External links
 
 

Anime directors
Living people
Japanese directors
Year of birth missing (living people)